John Culpepper (January 1841) was a Congressional Representative from North Carolina.

Origins
John Culpepper was born about 1761 near Wadesboro, Anson County, Province of North Carolina, the son of Sampson Culpepper (1737 Bertie County, Province of North Carolina – 1820 Wilkinson County, Georgia) and Eleanor Gilbert (April 25, 1745 Norfolk County, Virginia Colony – July 19, 1823 Wilkinson County, Georgia). John Culpeper of Albemarle, leader of Culpeper's Rebellion in 1677, was Culpepper's third great uncle.

Culpepper attended the public schools; became a minister and pastored Rocky River Baptist Church for fifty years; Under the authority of the Third North Carolina General Assembly during the American Revolution, Montgomery County, North Carolina was formed in 1779 from a portion of Anson County. Culpepper was to later represent U.S. Congressional Districts that contained both counties. District boundaries have been redefined each decade in the year following each national census since the 1790 census.

Political career
Culpepper presented credentials as a Federalist Member-elect to the Tenth Congress and served from March 4, 1807, until January 2, 1808, when the seat was declared vacant as the result of a contest on account of alleged irregularities; subsequently reelected to fill the vacancy declared by the House of Representatives and served from February 23, 1808, to March 3, 1809. He was deemed a man of sound sense, but not brilliant, useful rather than showy.

Culpepper was elected as a Federalist to the Thirteenth and Fourteenth Congresses (March 4, 1813 – March 3, 1817); unsuccessful candidate for reelection in 1816 to the Fifteenth Congress; elected as a Federalist to the Sixteenth Congress (March 4, 1819 – March 3, 1821); unsuccessful candidate for reelection in 1820 to the Seventeenth Congress; elected as an Adams-Clay Federalist to the Eighteenth Congress (March 4, 1823 – March 3, 1825); unsuccessful candidate for reelection in 1824 to the Nineteenth Congress; elected as an Adams to the Twentieth Congress (March 4, 1827 – March 3, 1829); declined to be candidate for reelection in 1828 and retired from public life.

Marriage and Progeny
Culpepper married and had children, including:

John Alexander Culpeper (December 9, 1800 Anson County, North Carolina, United States of America – March 26, 1873 Darlington County, South Carolina, USA); became a pastor. His first wife was "Let." (Leticia?) Russell. He secondly married Catherine Pinkney (December 8, 1807 North Carolina, USA – December 11, 1883 Society Hill, Darlington County, South Carolina, USA). His children included:
Dr. James Furman Culpeper (July 11, 1834 Anson County, North Carolina, USA – June 24, 1917 Timmonsville, Florence County, South Carolina, USA). His son by his first wife "Let." Russell. Captain of Culpepper's South Carolina Battery (SC 3rd Palmetto Battalion, Light Artillery Company C) during the War between the States, thereafter a medical doctor for 50 years.
A. Fuller Culpeper (June 28, 1843 Darlington County, North Carolina – circa 1900 Dade County, Florida). His son by either his first or second wife. Fuller through battlefield promotions eventually became a lieutenant in his elder brother's light artillery battery.
Charles M Culpeper (May 23, 1845 Darlington County, North Carolina – May 9, 1860 (aged 14)). Son by his second wife Catherine Pinkney.
Evan Alexander Culpepper Sr. (March 17, 1808 Anson County, North Carolina, United States of America – June 10, 1884 Coryell County, Texas, United States of America); had issue.

Death
Culpepper died at the residence of his son in Darlington County, South Carolina in January 1841; interment in the cemetery at Society Hill, South Carolina.

See also 
 Tenth United States Congress
 Thirteenth United States Congress
 Fourteenth United States Congress
 Sixteenth United States Congress
 Eighteenth United States Congress
 Twentieth United States Congress

References

External links 
 U.S. Congress Biographical Directory entry
 Find-a-Grave: Rev. John Culpepper Sr.

1761 births
1841 deaths
People from Anson County, North Carolina
People of colonial North Carolina
Baptist ministers from the United States
Baptists from North Carolina
Federalist Party members of the United States House of Representatives from North Carolina
National Republican Party members of the United States House of Representatives from North Carolina
Burials in South Carolina
Members of the United States House of Representatives removed by contest